Dick Williams (1929–2011) was an American baseball player and manager.

Dick Williams may also refer to:

 R. Norris Williams (1891–1968), American tennis player
 Dick Williams (magician) (1927–2020), American magician
 Dick Williams (singer) (1926–2018), American singer
 Dick Anthony Williams (1934–2012), American actor
 Dick Williams (executive), American baseball executive
 Dick Williams (footballer) (1905–1983), English footballer
 Dick Williams (bowls), Welsh-born Canadian international lawn bowler
 Dick William, former host of Georgia politics show The Georgia Gang

See also
 Richard Williams (disambiguation)